Mamed Khalidov (born 17 July 1980 in Grozny) is a Polish mixed martial artist. He is best known for competing in the Middleweight division of Polish MMA promotion KSW, where he is the former KSW Light Heavyweight and KSW Middleweight Champions. He is currently ranked #2 in the KSW Middleweight rankings.

Biography
Mamed Khalidov was born in Chechnya, Russia. He began practicing Kyokushin around age of 12 or 13 where he also holds black belt in. At age of 17 he fled from his homeland to Poland and continued practicing kyokushin while adding other combat styles on his repertoire such as Taekwondo, Shotokan Wrestling and Boxing soon after his arrival. He also became competitive in all sports. Later he also became interested about becoming mixed martial artist and went training Mixed martial arts, Muay Thai, Combat Sambo, Brazilian jiu-jitsu and Grappling.

Mixed martial arts career
As of December 2011, Khalidov has fought eleven times under the KSW banner, though never featuring in a tournament, instead fighting individually such opponents as Daniel Tabera and Matt Lindland.

Khalidov made his US debut with EliteXC on their October 10, 2008 ShoXC card against American Jason Guida.  After almost two hard-fought rounds, Khalidov stopped Guida on the feet with an unanswered torrent of punches.

Following the collapse of EliteXC, Khalidov has expressed interest in a hasty return to KSW, as previously outlined by his signing with ProElite in favor of nonexclusive contract status.  Due to a broken hand, Khalidov was unable to return for KSW X on December 12, 2008.  Following his recovery, he fought PRIDE veteran Daniel Acacio at KSW XI on 15 May, knocking him out in 1:10 minutes of the first round to win the newly created KSW Light Heavyweight Championship.

Khalidov signed a three-fight deal with World Victory Road Sengoku and his first appearance for the promotion was on the November 7th card against Sengoku middleweight champion Jorge Santiago.  Although, the fight was not a title bout, Khalidov defeated Santiago via first-round TKO. A rematch of the bout was held at World Victory Road Presents: Sengoku Raiden Championships 12 on March 7, 2010 for the Middleweight Championship, which Khalidov lost via controversial unanimous decision.

At KSW XIII Mamed fought Ryuta Sakurai to a draw. Sakurai secured a kimura early in the first round, but Khalidov escaped. During the rest of the fight he had 6 submission attempts including 4 guillotine chokes, 1 ankle lock and 1 heel hook, but couldn't force the tap from Sakurai.

Mamed Khalidov was expected to face Thales Leites and later Matt Lindland at KSW XV  However, both fighters were pulled from the card. Instead, Khalidov faced James Irvin at the event and won via submission at 0:33 into the first round.  He eventually faced Lindland at KSW 16 in May 2011 and won via submission in the first round.

Khalidov was originally scheduled to face Paulo Filho at KSW 17. However, Filho was forced out of the bout due to him going into rehab for a drug addiction and he was replaced by Jesse Taylor. Khalidov won the fight via submission (kneebar) in the first round.

Khalidov next competed against former UFC fighter Rodney Wallace on May 12, 2012 at KSW 19.  He won the fight via KO in the first round.

On December 1, 2012 he defeated Kendall Grove and won the fight via submission (achilles lock). Khalidov next faced Melvin Manhoef at KSW 23 on June 8, 2013, winning the fight by front choke in the first round.

On July 30, 2018 it was announced that Khalidov had vacated his middleweight championship belt in order to pursue a rematch against KSW Light Heavyweight champion Tomasz Narkun. On October 9, 2018, it was announced that the rematch would happen at KSW 46: Narkun vs. Khalidov 2 on December 1, 2018. Khalidov lost the rematch via unanimous decision and retired from the sport in the cage.

In September 2019, news surfaced that Khalidov will be returning from retirement to face Scott Askham in a catchweight bout at KSW 52 on December 7, 2019. He lost the fight via unanimous decision.

Khalidov next challenged Scott Askham for the KSW Middleweight Championship in a rematch bout at KSW 55: Askham vs. Khalidov 2 on October 10, 2020. He reclaimed the title via first-minute knockout.

Khalidov defended his title against Roberto Soldić on December 18, 2021 at KSW 65: Khalidov vs. Soldić. He lost the bout and his title via knockout after getting caught with a left hook in the second round.

Khalidov faced Mariusz Pudzianowski at KSW 77: Khalidov vs. Pudzianowski on December 17, 2022. He went on to defeat Pudzianowski via first round TKO stoppage after Pudzian tapped to ground and pound.

Personal life
Khalidov acquired Polish citizenship in 2015.

In June 2019 news surfaced that the police arrested Khalidov due to alleged illegal import of stolen cars. Khalidov is yet to appear before court.

Championships and accomplishments

Mixed martial arts
Konfrontacja Sztuk Walki
KSW Light Heavyweight Championship (One time; first)
KSW Middleweight Championship (Two times; former)
One successful title defence
Fight of the Night (One times) vs. Tomasz Narkun (KSW 46) 
Full Contact Prestige
FPC Middleweight Championship (One time)

Submission grappling
Abu Dhabi Combat Club
2007 ADCC Polish Trials Winner

Mixed martial arts record

|-
|Win
|align=center|36–8–2
|Mariusz Pudzianowski
|TKO (submission to punches)
|KSW 77: Khalidov vs. Pudzianowski
|
|align=center|1
|align=center|1:54
|Gliwice, Poland
|
|-
|Loss
|align=center|35–8–2
| Roberto Soldić
| KO (punch)
| KSW 65: Khalidov vs. Soldić
|
|align=center|2
|align=center|3:40
|Gliwice, Poland
| 
|-
|Win
|align=center|35–7–2
| Scott Askham
| KO (switch kick and punches)
| KSW 55: Askham vs. Khalidov 2
|
|align=center|1
|align=center|0:36
|Łódź, Poland
| 
|-
|Loss
|align=center|34–7–2
| Scott Askham
| Decision (unanimous)
| KSW 52: Race
|
|align=center|3
|align=center|5:00
|Gliwice, Poland
| 
|-
|Loss
| align=center| 34–6–2
| Tomasz Narkun
| Decision (unanimous)
| KSW 46: Narkun vs. Khalidov 2
| 
| align=center|3
| align=center|5:00
| Gliwice, Poland
| 
|-
|Loss
| align=center| 34–5–2
| Tomasz Narkun
| Submission (triangle choke)
| KSW 42: Khalidov vs. Narkun
| 
| align=center|3
| align=center|1:18
| Łódź, Poland
| 
|-
|Win
| align=center| 34–4–2
| Borys Mańkowski
| Decision (unanimous)
| KSW 39: Colosseum
| 
| align=center|3
| align=center|5:00
| Warsaw, Poland
| 
|-
|-
| Win
| align=center| 33–4–2
| Luke Barnatt
|KO (punches) 
| |ACB 54: Supersonic
| 
| align=center|1
| align=center|0:21
| Manchester, England
| 
|-
|-
| Win
| align=center| 32–4–2
| Aziz Karaoglu
| Decision (majority)
| KSW 35: Khalidov vs. Karaoglu
| 
| align=center| 3
| align=center| 5:00
| Gdańsk/Sopot, Poland
| 
|-
| Win
| align=center| 31–4–2
| Michał Materla
| KO (flying knee and punches)
| KSW 33: Khalidov vs. Materla
| 
| align=center| 1
| align=center| 0:31
| Kraków, Poland
| 
|-
| Win
| align=center| 30–4–2
| Brett Cooper
| Decision (unanimous)
| KSW 29: Reload
| 
| align=center| 3
| align=center| 5:00
| Kraków, Poland
| 
|-
| Win
| align=center| 29–4–2
| Maiquel Falcão
| Submission (armbar)
| KSW 27: Cage Time
| 
| align=center| 1
| align=center| 4:52
| Gdańsk, Poland
| 
|-
| Win
| align=center| 28–4–2
| Ryuta Sakurai
| Submission (triangle choke)
| KSW 25: Khalidov vs. Sakurai 2
| 
| align=center| 1
| align=center| 2:03
| Wroclaw, Poland
| 
|-
| Win
| align=center| 27–4–2
| Melvin Manhoef
| Submission (guillotine choke)
| KSW 23: Khalidov vs. Manhoef
| 
| align=center| 1
| align=center| 2:09
| Gdańsk, Poland
| 
|-
| Win
| align=center| 26–4–2
| Kendall Grove
| Submission (achilles lock)
| KSW 21: Ultimate Explanation
| 
| align=center| 2
| align=center| 3:27
| Warsaw, Poland
| 
|-
| Win
| align=center| 25–4–2
| Rodney Wallace
| KO (punch)
| KSW 19: Pudzianowski vs. Sapp
| 
| align=center| 1
| align=center| 1:55
| Lódz, Poland
| 
|-
| Win
| align=center| 24–4–2
| Jesse Taylor
| Submission (kneebar)
| KSW 17: Revenge
| 
| align=center| 1
| align=center| 1:42
| Lódz,Poland
| 
|-
| Win
| align=center| 23–4–2
| Matt Lindland
| Technical Submission (guillotine choke)
| KSW 16: Khalidov vs. Lindland
| 
| align=center| 1
| align=center| 1:35
| Gdańsk, Poland
| 
|-
| Win
| align=center| 22–4–2
| James Irvin
|  Submission (armbar)
| KSW 15: Contemporary Gladiators
| 
| align=center| 1
| align=center| 0:33
| Warsaw, Poland
| 
|-
| Win
| align=center| 21–4–2
| Yuki Sasaki
| TKO (punches)
| World Victory Road Presents: Soul of Fight
| 
| align=center| 1
| align=center| 2:22
| Tokyo, Japan
| 
|-
|  Draw
| align=center| 20–4–2
| Ryuta Sakurai
| Draw (unanimous)
| KSW 13: Kumite
| 
| align=center| 4
| align=center| 3:00
| Katowice, Poland
| 
|-
| Loss
| align=center| 20–4–1
| Jorge Santiago
| Decision (unanimous)
| World Victory Road Presents: Sengoku Raiden Championships 12
| 
| align=center| 5
| align=center| 5:00
| Tokyo, Japan
| 
|-
| Win
| align=center| 20–3–1
| Jorge Santiago
| KO (punches)
| World Victory Road Presents: Sengoku 11
| 
| align=center| 1
| align=center| 2:45
| Tokyo, Japan
| 
|-
| Win
| align=center| 19–3–1
| Daniel Acácio
| KO (punches)
| KSW 11: Khalidov vs. Acacio
| 
| align=center| 1
| align=center| 1:10
| Warsaw, Poland
| 
|-
| Win
| align=center| 18–3–1
| Jason Guida 
| TKO (punches)
| ShoXC: Elite Challenger Series
| 
| align=center| 2
| align=center| 4:53
| Hammond, Indiana, United States
| 
|-
|  Draw
| align=center| 17–3–1
| Daniel Tabera
| Draw
| KSW Extra
| 
| align=center| 3
| align=center| 3:00
| Dabrowa Górnicza, Poland
| 
|-
| Win
| align=center| 17–3
| Valdas Pocevicius
| Submission (guillotine choke)
| KSW 9: Konfrontacja
| 
| align=center| 1
| align=center| 0:52
| Warsaw, Poland
| 
|-
| Win
| align=center| 16–3
| Petr Ondrus
| TKO (hand injury)
| KSW Elimination 2
| 
| align=center| 2
| align=center| 5:00
| Wroclaw, Poland
| 
|-
| Win
| align=center| 15–3
| Dave Dalgliesh	
| Submission (twister)
| KSW 8: Konfrontacja
| 
| align=center| 1
| align=center| 1:52
| Warsaw, Poland
| 
|-
| Win
| align=center| 14–3
| Martin Zawada
| Submission (heel hook)
| KSW Elimination 1
| 
| align=center| 1
| align=center| 4:22
| Warsaw, Poland
| 
|-
| Win
| align=center| 13–3
| Igor Pokrajac
| Submission (leg lock)
| Boxing Explosion 2 
| 
| align=center| 2
| align=center| 2:33
| Zagreb, Croatia
| 
|-
| Win
| align=center| 12–3
| Alexander Stefanovic
| TKO (punches)
| KSW 7: Konfrontacja 
| 
| align=center| 1
| align=center| 3:01
| Warsaw, Poland
| 
|-
| Win
| align=center| 11–3
| Tor Troéng
| Submission (triangle choke)
| FCP 3: Khalidov vs. Troeng 
| 
| align=center| 1
| align=center| 0:55
| Poznan, Poland
| 
|-
| Win
| align=center| 10–3
| Michal Garnys
| TKO (punches)
| Extreme Cage 2 
| 
| align=center| 3
| align=center| 0:11
| Warsaw, Poland
| 
|-
| Win
| align=center| 9–3
| Rashid Magomadov
| Submission (triangle choke) 
| President's Cup: Muay Thai Tournament 
| 
| align=center| 1
| align=center| 2:45
| Grozny, Russia
| 
|-
| Win
| align=center| 8–3
| Jacek Buczko
| TKO (punches)
| Full Contact Prestige 2 
| 
| align=center| 1
| align=center| 4:51
| Warsaw, Poland
| 
|-
| Win
| align=center| 7–3
| Andrzej Kosecki  	
| TKO (submission to strikes)
| Extreme Cage 1 
| 
| align=center| 1
| align=center| 3:27
| Warsaw, Poland
| 
|-
| Win
| align=center| 6–3
| Pawel Krys
| KO (punch)
| Full Contact Prestige 
| 
| align=center| 1
| align=center| 0:45
| Warsaw, Poland
| 
|-
| Win
| align=center| 5–3
| Andre Reinders   	 
| KO (punch)
| MMA Sport 3 
| 
| align=center| 1
| align=center| 0:39
| Warsaw, Poland
| 
|-
| Win
| align=center| 4–3
| Danielius Razmus   	 
| Submission (twister) 
| MMA Sport 3 
| 
| align=center| 1
| align=center| 1:46
| Warsaw, Poland
| 
|-
| Loss
| align=center| 3–3
| Valdas Pocevicius
| Submission (rear-naked choke)
| Shooto Lithuania: Gladiators 2
| 
| align=center| 1
| align=center| 3:15
| Vilnius, Lithuania
| 
|-
| Win
| align=center| 3–2
| Adam Skupien
| KO (head kick)
| MMA Sport 2
| 
| align=center| 1
| align=center| 0:06
| Warsaw, Poland
| 
|-
| Win
| align=center| 2–2
| Marek Krajewski
| TKO (Punches)
| MMA Sport 1 
| 
| align=center| 1
| align=center| 2:34
| Warsaw, Poland
| 
|-
| Win
| align=center| 1–2
| Pawel Klimiewicz	
| Decision (unanimous)
| Shidokan Poland Gala 
| 
| align=center| 3
| align=center| 5:00
| Warsaw, Poland
| 
|-
| Loss
| align=center| 0–2
| Grazhuydas Smailis
| Submission (rear-naked choke)
| Shooto Lithuania: Gladiators
| 
| align=center| 1
| align=center| 1:54
| Vilnius, Lithuania
| 
|-
| Loss
| align=center| 0–1
| Nerijus Valiukevicius   	
|  TKO (punches)
| Shooto Lithuania: Bushido King 
| 
| align=center| 1
| align=center| 4:49
| Vilnius, Lithuania
|

See also
 List of current KSW fighters
 List of male mixed martial artists

References

External links

1980 births
Living people
Polish male mixed martial artists
Middleweight mixed martial artists
Light heavyweight mixed martial artists
Polish practitioners of Brazilian jiu-jitsu
Polish male karateka
Polish male taekwondo practitioners
Polish Muay Thai practitioners
Polish submission wrestlers
Refugees in Poland
Chechen mixed martial artists
Chechen practitioners of Brazilian jiu-jitsu
Chechen submission wrestlers
Chechen taekwondo practitioners
Mixed martial artists utilizing Kyokushin kaikan
Mixed martial artists utilizing taekwondo
Mixed martial artists utilizing Muay Thai
Mixed martial artists utilizing Brazilian jiu-jitsu
Sportspeople from Grozny
Naturalized citizens of Poland
Polish people of Chechen descent
Polish people of Russian descent
Polish Muslims
Chechen people